A list of windmills in Loire-Atlantique, France,

External links
French windmills website

Windmills in France
Loire-Atlantique
Buildings and structures in Loire-Atlantique